Forrew is a townland in the civil parish of Moygownagh and historical barony of Tirawley, County Mayo, Ireland. Forrew Bog, a natural heritage peatland, is partially within the townland.

References

County Mayo geography stubs
Townlands of County Mayo